Shooting at the 2005 Southeast Asian Games was split into two venues:
Trap and Skeet in PNSA Clay Target Range, Muntinlupa, Metro Manila, Philippines.
Air Pistol, Rifle, Practical in the PSC-PNSA Shooting Range BNS in Fort Bonifacio, Taguig City, Metro Manila, Philippines.

Medal table

Medalists

International Shooting Sport Federation

Men

Women

International Practical Shooting Confederation

Men

Women

External links
Southeast Asian Games Official Results

2005 Southeast Asian Games events
2005
2005 in shooting sports
Shooting competitions in the Philippines